The Canton of Argent-sur-Sauldre is a former canton situated in the Cher département and in the Centre region of France. It was disbanded following the French canton reorganisation which came into effect in March 2015. It consisted of 4 communes, which joined the canton of Aubigny-sur-Nère in 2015. It had 5,018 inhabitants (2012).

Composition
The canton comprised 4 communes:
Argent-sur-Sauldre
Blancafort
Brinon-sur-Sauldre
Clémont

Population

See also
 Arrondissements of the Cher department
 Cantons of the Cher department
 Communes of the Cher department

References

Argent-sur-Sauldre
2015 disestablishments in France
States and territories disestablished in 2015